West Ham United Women Football Club is an English women's football club affiliated with West Ham United. They were formed in 1991 and play home games at Dagenham & Redbridge's Chigwell Construction Stadium on Victoria Road.

History

Whilst the 1970s saw a short lived incarnation of West Ham United Ladies, it was early in 1991 when Roger Morgan, the Football in the Community officer at West Ham United, mooted the idea of forming the present ladies section of the club. Following a number of initial coaching sessions to bring in local players and the capture of John Greenacre, who had then recently relinquished his managerial posts at Romford Ladies, to help organise the club, the first friendly match was set for 29 March 1992 resulting in a defeat to Barnet Ladies. Undeterred, two teams were entered into the Greater London Regional Women's Football League for the following season; one in Division 3 and the other in Division 4 and the Hammers opened their first competitive season with a 5–1 victory against Hackney “B” on 27 September 1992 going on to finish the campaign in a respectable fourth place although the second team found life harder and were relegated to the 5th Division. A third-place finish the following season with was sufficient to earn promotion to Division Two and the next season there was a promotion into Division One following another third-place finish.

1995–96 saw a season of consolidation after the two consecutive promotions in two years with a mid table placing, but the season saw the club enter the FA Women's Cup for the first time, having been encouraged by a goalless draw with Arsenal Ladies the previous year in the London FA Women's Cup. The club also embarked on its first overseas tour taking in trips to Germany and Holland. International recognition was furthered as Claire Lacey, the Hammers goalkeeper, was awarded an England cap in an away fixture against Portugal to become the club's first international representative.

Two more season of consolidation as a mid table Division One side in the Greater London League followed as the club went through a difficult period off the pitch, with personnel changes in the backroom staff and ground problems seeing Brampton Manor School, Barking and Little Heath all used as home grounds.

The 1998–99 season saw the Hammers fortunes take an upturn reaching their first cup final in the Russell Cup and more importantly gaining the runners up spot in the league and with it promotion into the Greater London League Premier Division. The momentum continued as the Hammers immediately made an impact in the Premier Division coming second behind the semi professional set up at Fulham, before clinching the title the year after, coupled with a run to the 4th round of the FA Women's Cup.

2000–01 saw the introduction of the now highly successful junior section playing in the Essex County Girls League laying the foundations for another period of growth for the club as a second successful Greater London League Premier League campaign this time saw the Hammers winning the promotion play off and allowed the club to start the 2002–03 season in the South East Combination League, where a fourth-place finish showed the Hammers ability to hold their own at this level. The promise of being able to step up further emerged when the runners up spot was claimed the year after. Hopes were high the club could go one further for the 2004–05 campaign and in a nail-biting finish the Hammers emerged victorious from a winner takes all final league game with Northampton to win the title, only just missing out on the double following a league cup final defeat to the same opponents.

Just 13 seasons after starting out West Ham United Ladies had now reached the FA Women's Premier League and achieved a sixth-place finish in their opening season at this level despite a shaky start as they got accustomed to the higher standard. There were no such problems for the reserve team though, who were only just pipped to the runners up spot in the Premier League (Reserves) Division Two South. The following season was a disappointment as the team started to slide and the club ended up in a situation where they would be relegated if the teams below were to win their games in hand although by the end of the season results had gone in the Hammers favour. The Reserve team finished rock bottom in their division but amongst the junior sections the club continued to flourish and from the junior ranks both management staff and playing personnel were elevated to get the club back on track.

2007–08 saw Tony Marshall take over as first team manager helped by Alex Bonner as coach. The club switched to play home games at Harlow Town and with a massive rebuilding job to be done the Hammers turned to youth with a side featuring many previous junior players from the club, who were more than able to hold their own with a sixth-place finish.

The next season saw continued improvements: a new base at Thurrock, a highest-ever third-place finish in the league, and the first team lifting their first major trophy after winning the Essex FA County Cup. The success spanned across the whole club with the reserve team ending the season top of the Premier (Reserves) Division Two South and amongst the junior side's haul of silverware were the London FA Girls Youth Cup and the Southern Region Under 16 FA Tesco Cup.

The Hammers were again amongst the leading sides in the 2009–10 campaign although too many draws saw them slip to fifth position with the reserve team consolidating following their promotion. Again there was success for the junior sides with the Under 16 team winning the UK Home International Tesco Cup at the Reebok Stadium. 2010–11 saw the side lead the table for much of the winter but were pipped to the promotion spots in the run in eventually finishing in third place. However the Essex FA County Cup was regained and best ever runs in the FA Women's Cup and FA Women's Premier League Cup saw both quarter finals reached.

2011–12 followed a similar pattern with good cup runs taking the club to the Essex FA County Cup final and the FA Women's Premier League Cup quarter final. Again a third-place finish was achieved in the FA Women's Premier League Southern Division.

In Summer 2014, former professional footballer Julian Dicks took charge of the team. His first competitive game was against Spurs Ladies. He helped to improve the team from their 10th-place finish the season and then to a sixth-placed finish in the 2014–15 season, along with a London FA Capital Women's Cup Final date against Charlton Athletic Ladies.

In March 2015, John Hunt and his son Stephen Hunt were appointed Joint Chairman. On 5 June 2015, the club announced the creation of the West Ham Ladies Learning Academy. In July 2015, Marc Nurse became manager replacing ex-professional footballer Julian Dicks, who was promoted to work with the men's first team. Under Nurse, West Ham go on to finish 10th for the 2015–16 season. The season began in controversial circumstances when club captain Stacey Little led a small walkout of players and went to the press. Little had criticised the main club in the press the previous year over a lack of funding. The highlight of the season by far was the Ladies' first and last full league match at Upton Park in the club's last season there before moving to Stratford. The Ladies secured a record crowd of 1,741 as a penalty by captain Katie Bottom sealed a 1–0 win. The game became widely known for an off-the-ball incident when the video of a Spurs defender stamping on the head of West Ham striker Whitney Locke went viral.

During the summer of 2016, the team toured the Netherlands and played two top sides (MSV Duisburg and FC Twente) and were beaten in both matches. The Chairmen then took the decision to replace Nurse as manager and replace him with James Marrs who had recently led Brighton Ladies to promotion but was then sacked in controversial circumstances. Marrs appealed the circumstances of his sacking and in October 2016 an FA hearing held that the finding of the Sussex FA were such that "no reasonable body would have reached" and his record was cleared. The following day West Ham United nevertheless released Marrs as the Hunts were replaced as Chairmen and the Ladies absorbed into the main club. The events leading to the takeover of the Ladies were triggered by unfavourable press coverage of the main club's treatment of the Ladies team. For the rest of the 2016–17 season, the Ladies were managed by the West Ham Foundation coaches finishing 9th. The summer of 2017 saw West Ham Ladies undergo significant changes as the club looked to reach the top Women's Southern League within five years. Jack Sullivan, son of West Ham chairman David Sullivan was named the team's managing director, while Karen Ray took up the role of ladies' general manager. Greg de Carnys also moved over from the Academy to look after the ladies' first team and academy. In the first half of the season, the results were poor with 12 losses from 17 games, and on 9 December 2017, it was announced that de Carnys had parted company with the club and that Ray would take charge of the team on an interim basis. Following this, the results improved, with 11 wins and only 1 loss from the next 14 games, including victories in both the Isthmian League Women's Cup and FA WPL Plate.

2018–present: FA WSL

 On 28 May 2018, it was announced that West Ham Ladies had successfully gained entry into the WSL, the top league in England. West Ham Ladies changed their name to West Ham United women's team in July 2018. Former Women's Super League winner Matt Beard was appointed head coach of West Ham United women in June 2018. Beard secured the signings of experienced players including Gilly Flaherty, Claire Rafferty, Jane Ross and Tessel Middag in preparation for the club's first season in the WSL. The club reached the FA Women's Cup Final in May 2019, ultimately losing 3–0 to Manchester City. 

Beard and the club agreed to part ways by mutual consent on 19 November 2020. The board named goalkeeping coach Billy Stewart and first-team coach Paul McHugh as interim head coaches while a search for a full-time manager is being undertaken.

In 2021 West Ham finished 8th in the Women's Super League table, leaving them safe of relegation.

Players

Current squad

Management

Executive

Technical

Honours

Senior
Women's FA Cup runners up : 2018–19
FA Women's Premier League Plate: 2017–18
Isthmian League Women's Cup: 2017–18
Essex FA County Cup Winners: 2008–09, 2010–11
South East Combination League: 2004–05
Greater London Regional Premier League: 2000–01, 2001–02
Greater London Regional League Play Off Winners: 2001–02

Reserve
FA Women's Premier (Reserve) League Division Two South: 2008–09

Youth
London FA Junior cup Winners: 2010–11
UK Home International Under 16 Tesco Cup: 2009–10
English National Under 16 Tesco Cup: 2009–10
Southern Region Under 16 Tesco Cup: 2008–09, 2009–10
London FA Girls Under 16 Youth Cup: 2008–09
Essex FA Under 10 County Futsal Cup: 2013–14
Essex FA Under 16 County Cup: 2009–10, 2011–12
Essex FA Under 14 County Cup: 2011–12
Essex County Girls Football Under 16 League: 2006–07, 2007–08, 2008–09, 2009–10, 2011–12
Essex County Girls Football Under 16 League Cup: 2006–07, 2007–08, 2008–09, 2009–10, 2011–12
Essex County Girls Football Under 15 League: 2004–05, 2014–15
Essex County Girls Football Under 15 League Cup: 2001–02, 2004–05
Essex County Girls Football Under 14 League: 2003–04, 2005–06, 2006–07, 2008–09, 2010–11, 2011–12
Essex County Girls Football Under 14 League Cup: 2005–06, 2006–07, 2008–09, 2010–11, 2011–12
Essex County Girls Football Under 13 League: 2004–05
Essex County Girls Football Under 13 League Cup: 2004–05, 2013–14
Essex County Girls Football Under 12 League: 2005–06, 2006–07, 2010–11
Essex County Girls Football Under 12 League Cup: 2009–10, 2011–12
Essex County Girls Football Under 11 League South: 2005–06, 2012–13, 2013–14, 2014–15
Essex County Girls Football Under 11 League West: 2008–09
Essex County Girls Football Under 11 League London & Central: 2011–12
Essex County Girls Football Under 11 League Cup: 2008–09, 2011–12, 2012–13, 2014–15
Essex County Girls Football Under 10 League London: 2009–10, 2010–11
Essex County Girls Football Under 10 League Cup: 2009–10, 2010–11

Seasons

Key

 P = Played
 W = Games won
 D = Games drawn
 L = Games lost
 F = Goals for
 A = Goals against
 Pts = Points
WSL = Women's Super League
PL Na = FA Women's Premier League National Division
PL S = FA Women's Premier League Southern Division
SE C = South East Combination Women's Football League

 DR = Determining Round
 GS = Group Stage
 R1 = Round 1
 R2 = Round 2
 R3 = Round 3
 R4 = Round 4
 R5 = Round 5
 R6 = Round 6
 QF = Quarter-finals
 SF = Semi-finals
 RU = Runner Up
 CH = Champions

References

External links

Women's football clubs in England
West Ham United F.C.
Association football clubs established in 1991
Women's football clubs in London
1991 establishments in England
FA Women's National League teams